Jack Creek is a stream in Elko County, in the U.S. state of Nevada. The community of Jack Creek, Nevada, is near the stream.

History
Jack Creek was named for P. J. "Old Jack" Harrington, an early rancher.

Features

See also
List of rivers of Nevada

References

Rivers of Elko County, Nevada
Rivers of Nevada